Kentucky Thunder, or Ricky Skaggs and Kentucky Thunder, is the band that plays with American country and bluegrass singer Ricky Skaggs.  Many members of the band have won numerous awards.  Bandleader Ricky Skaggs plays mandolin and is the lead vocalist. The group has won the Instrumental Group of the Year award from the International Bluegrass Music Association multiple times, as well as seven Grammy Awards.

Line-up
The current line-up is;
Mike Rogers - Guitar and Tenor Vocals
Russell Carson - Banjo
Jake Workman - Lead Guitar
Dennis Parker - Rhythm Guitar, Baritone Vocals, Mandolin, Fiddle
Billy Contreras - Fiddle
Kevin Gift, Jr. - Upright Bass, Vocals

Discography

Guest artists on The Chieftains' Down the Old Plank Road: The Nashville Sessions (2002)

Awards

Grammy awards
Source:
 1998 Best Bluegrass Album: Ricky Skaggs and Kentucky Thunder for Bluegrass Rules!
 1999 Best Bluegrass Album: Ricky Skaggs and Kentucky Thunder for Ancient Tones
 2000 Best Southern, Country, or Bluegrass Gospel Album: Ricky Skaggs and Kentucky Thunder for Soldier Of The Cross
 2003 Best Country Performance By A Duo or Group With Vocal: Ricky Skaggs and Kentucky Thunder for A Simple Life
 2004 Best Bluegrass Album: Ricky Skaggs and Kentucky Thunder for Brand New Strings
 2006 Best Bluegrass Album: Ricky Skaggs and Kentucky Thunder for Instrumentals
 2008 Best Bluegrass Album: Ricky Skaggs and Kentucky Thunder for Honoring the Fathers of Bluegrass: Tribute to 1946 & 1947

IBMA (International Bluegrass Music Association) Awards
 1998 Instrumental Group Of The Year: Ricky Skaggs & Kentucky Thunder
 1998 Album Of The Year: Ricky Skaggs & Kentucky Thunder for Bluegrass Rules!
 1999 Instrumental Group Of The Year: Ricky Skaggs & Kentucky Thunder
 2000 Instrumental Group Of The Year: Ricky Skaggs & Kentucky Thunder
 2002 Instrumental Group Of The Year: Ricky Skaggs & Kentucky Thunder
 2003 Instrumental Group Of The Year: Ricky Skaggs & Kentucky Thunder
 2004 Instrumental Group Of The Year: Ricky Skaggs & Kentucky Thunder
 2005 Instrumental Group Of The Year: Ricky Skaggs & Kentucky Thunder
 2006 Instrumental Group Of The Year: Ricky Skaggs & Kentucky Thunder

References

External Links
Andy Leftwich Interview Namm Oral History Library (2020)

Musical groups established in 1997
American bluegrass music groups
Grammy Award winners
Musical groups from Kentucky